Plăieșii de Jos ( or Kászon,) is a commune in Harghita County, Romania. It lies in the Székely Land, an ethno-cultural region in eastern Transylvania.

Component villages 
The commune is composed of five villages:

 Colloquially Imper-Doboi or Doboi.

History 
The villages were part of the Székely Land region of the historical Transylvania province. They belonged to Csíkszék district. In 1850, they became part of the Udvarhely military region. After the administrative reform of Transylvania in 1876, they fell within the Csík County in the Kingdom of Hungary. After the Treaty of Trianon of 1920, they became part of Romania and fell within Ciuc County during the interwar period. In 1940, the second Vienna Award granted the Northern Transylvania to Hungary and the villages were held by Hungary until 1944. After Soviet occupation, the Romanian administration returned and the commune became officially part of Romania in 1947. Between 1952 and 1960, the commune fell within the Magyar Autonomous Region, between 1960 and 1968 the Mureș-Magyar Autonomous Region. In 1968, the province was abolished, and since then, the commune has been part of Harghita County.

Demographics
The commune has an absolute Hungarian (Székely) majority. According to the 2011 census it has a population of 3,012 of which 91.93% or 2,769 are Hungarian. Imper village has a Romanian majority.

Twinnings 
The commune is twinned with:
 Pupinge, Switzerland
 Abasár, Hungary
 Ásotthalom, Hungary
 Abacseke, Hungary
 Szajol, Hungary
 Csákvár, Hungary
 Lepsény, Hungary

References

Communes in Harghita County
Localities in Transylvania
Székely communities